Nutbourne railway station serves the village of Nutbourne, near Chichester in West Sussex, England.

It is located on the West Coastway Line that runs between Brighton and Southampton,  from Brighton.

Services 
All services at Nutbourne are operated by Southern using  and  EMUs.

The typical off-peak service in trains per hour on mondays to saturdays is:

 1 tph to 
 1 tph to 

During the peak hours, there are additional services to Brighton via Worthing, London Victoria via Horsham, Southampton Central and Portsmouth Harbour.

The typical service on Sundays is:

 1 tph to Brighton via Worthing
 1 tph to Portsmouth Harbour

Gallery

References

External links 

Railway stations in West Sussex
DfT Category F2 stations
Former London, Brighton and South Coast Railway stations
Railway stations in Great Britain opened in 1906
Railway stations served by Govia Thameslink Railway
Southbourne, West Sussex